Esmail Babolian is an Iranian numerical analyst, best known as the pioneer professor of numerical analysis in Iran. He has published over 60 international papers in different areas of numerical analysis. Recently he and Mohebalizadeh have developed a fast numerical method for solving differential equations with high accuracy. Babolian is member of the Institute for Research in Fundamental Sciences.

Education
Ph.D. University of Liverpool 1980, dissertation: Galerkin Method for Integral and Integro-Differential Equations, Mathematics Subject Classification: 65—Numerical analysis.

References

Living people
Writers from Tehran
21st-century Iranian mathematicians
21st-century Iranian inventors
Numerical analysts
Academic staff of Kharazmi University
1946 births